Daniel Vázquez Sosa (born May 18, 1995, in Mexico City) is a Mexican professional footballer who last played for América Premier. He made his professional debut with América during a 5–0 Liga MX win over Chiapas on 14 February 2015.

References

1995 births
Living people
Mexican footballers
Association football midfielders
Club América footballers
Alebrijes de Oaxaca players
Liga MX players
Ascenso MX players
Liga Premier de México players
Footballers from Mexico City